is a Japanese mobile game developed by Liber Entertainment. The original game was released on June 26, 2015 on Android and July 3, 2015 for the iOS. It was followed up with the release of an updated mobile game, I-Chu Étoile Stage, on April 30, 2020, while the original game was discontinued in July 2020. A port for Nintendo Switch was announced in October 2021, and was released in Japan on November 10, 2022.

Along with the game, the franchise has released several CDs portrayed by the characters in the game, and the success of the game led to several adaptations for the franchise, including stage plays and an anime television series by Lay-duce, which aired from January 6 to March 24, 2021.

Characters

Pop'N Star

RE:BERSERK

Lancelot

Tenjō Tenge

F∞F

Twinkle Bell

I♥B

ArS

Other characters

Media

Game
I-Chu is developed by Liber Entertainment and scheduled for launch in June 2015 on the iOS and Android, with pre-registrations opening on May 18, 2015. The game was later released on June 26, 2015 on Android and July 3, 2015 for the iOS. The game included a cast of 42 voice actors and was described as a "love rhythm adventure" game.

A second mobile game titled I-Chu Étoile Stage was originally scheduled to launch in Q3 2019, but after several delays, it launched on April 30, 2020. In June 2020, Liber Entertainment announced they would be discontinuing online services for the original mobile game on July 6, 2020, which would remain playable with all features unlocked until December 13, 2020.
A port for Nintendo Switch was announced in October 2021, and was released in Japan on November 10, 2022.

Stage plays
A stage play adaptation was announced during a fan meeting in 2017. The first stage play, I-Chu the Stage: Stairway to Etoile, ran from August 25–27, 2017 in Osaka and September 6–10, 2017 in Tokyo. The play had a second run from February 23 to March 1, 2018, in Tokyo, under the title I-Chu the Stage: Stairway to Etoile 2018. The third stage play, I-Chu the Stage: Rose Ecarlate was announced at the stage play's first fan meeting and ran from April 21–29, 2019 in Tokyo and May 10–12, 2019 in Osaka, with Hiro Isenao directing and writing the script. A fourth stage play, I-Chu the Stage: Rose Ecarlate Deux, ran from October 10–15, 2019 in Tokyo.

In addition to the stage plays, the cast of the stage plays held concerts while performing in character. The first concert, Live!! I-Chu the Stage: Etincelle took place in Zepp Tokyo on November 25, 2017. The second concert, Live!! I-Chu the Stage: Planete et Fleurs, took place on July 27, 2019 in Tokyo.

Anime
An anime television series adaptation titled I-Chu: Halfway Through the Idol was announced in April 2019. The series is directed by Hitoshi Nanba and written by Yoshimi Narita, with Mina Ōsawa in charge of character designs, Twin Engine as producer, Lay-duce producing the animation, and Yoshiaki Dewa composing the music. The series aired from January 6 to March 24, 2021 on Tokyo MX and BS11. The opening theme song is "Rainbow☆Harmony", and the ending theme song is "Singing! Crunchyroll licensed the series outside Asia. Muse Communication licensed the series in Southeast Asia and South Asia and is streaming it on their Muse Asia YouTube channel.

Reception
Over 10,000 users pre-registered for I-Chu before the game's release. As of 2017, 1 million users were playing the game.

Notes

References

External links
 
 Official I-Chu Étoile Stage website
 Official stage play website
 Official anime website
 

2015 video games
2021 anime television series debuts
Android (operating system) games
Anime television series based on video games
Crunchyroll anime
Dating sims
IOS games
Nintendo Switch games
Japan-exclusive video games
Japanese idol video games
Japanese idols in anime and manga
Lay-duce
Musicals based on video games
Tokyo MX original programming
Video games developed in Japan
Muse Communication